The following is a list of Cessna aircraft models:

Cessna

 

Cessna Comet
Cessna Model A 
Cessna Model AA 
Cessna Model AC 
Cessna Model AF 
Cessna Model AS 
Cessna Model AW 
Cessna Model BW
Cessna CG-2 Primary glider
Cessna CH-1
Cessna CH-4 (US military designation YH-41)
Cessna Model CR-1 
Cessna Model CR-2
Cessna Model CR-3 
Cessna Model CW-6
Cessna Model C-34 (US military designation UC-77B)
Cessna Model C-37 (US military designation UC-77C)
Cessna Model C-38
Cessna Model C-39
Cessna Model C-145 
Cessna Model C-165 (US military designation UC-94)
Cessna Model EC-1
Cessna Model EC-2
Cessna Model DC-6 (US military designation UC-77 and UC-77A)
Cessna NGP
Cessna T-50 Bobcat (US military designation AT-8, AT-17, C-78 and JRC)
Cessna 120
Cessna 140
Cessna 142
Cessna 150 Commuter, Patroller & Aerobat (US military designation T-51)
Cessna 152
Cessna 160
Cessna 162 Skycatcher
Cessna 165 Airmaster
Cessna 170
Cessna 172 Skyhawk and Cutlass (US military designation Cessna T-41 Mescalero)
Cessna 175 Skylark
Cessna 177 Cardinal
Cessna 180 Skywagon
Cessna 182 Skylane
Cessna 185 Skywagon (US military designation U-17)
Cessna 187
Cessna 188 AGwagon, AGpickup, AGtruck, and AGhusky
Cessna 190
Cessna 195 (US military designation LC-126 and U-20)
Cessna 205 Super Skywagon
Cessna 206 Stationair & Super Skylane
Cessna 207 Skywagon, Stationair 7 & 8 (US military designation U-26)
Cessna 208 Caravan (US military designation C-16 and U-27)
Cessna 210 Centurion
Cessna P260 (US military designation C-106 Loadmaster)
Cessna T240 marketed as the TTx
Cessna 303 Crusader
Cessna 305 Bird Dog (US military designation O-1, L-19 and OE-1)
Cessna 308
Cessna 309
Cessna 310 (US military designation L-27 and U-3)
Cessna 318 (US military designation T-37 Tweet, Cessna A-37 Dragonfly and YT-48)
Cessna 319
 Cessna 320 Skyknight
Cessna 321 (US military designation O-1C and OE-2)
Cessna 325
Cessna 327
Cessna 330
Cessna 335
Cessna 336 Skymaster
Cessna 337 Skymaster (US military designation Cessna O-2 Skymaster)
Cessna 340
Cessna 350 Corvalis formerly the Columbia 350
Cessna 400 Corvalis TT formerly the Columbia 400
Cessna 401 Utiliner and Businessliner
Cessna 402 Utiliner and Businessliner
Cessna 404 Titan II (US military designation C-28)
Cessna 406 Caravan II
Cessna 407 (not flown)
Cessna 408 SkyCourier
Cessna 411
Cessna 414 Chancellor
Cessna 421 Golden Eagle
Cessna 425 Conquest I
Cessna 435 Conquest II
Cessna 441 Conquest II
Cessna 500 Citation I
Cessna 501 Citation ISP 
Cessna 510 Citation Mustang  
Cessna 525 CitationJet, CJ1, CJ1+
Cessna 525A CJ2, CJ2+
Cessna 525B CJ3
Cessna 525C CJ4
Cessna 526 CitationJet (military trainer)
Cessna E530 (Textron AirLand Scorpion)
Cessna 550 Citation II, Cessna Citation Bravo
Cessna 551 Citation IISP
Cessna 552 (US military designation T-47A)
Cessna S550 Citation SII
Cessna 560 Citation V, Citation Ultra, Citation Encore, Citation Encore+ (US military designation UC-35)
Cessna Citation 560XL Excel, XLS, XLS+
Cessna 620
Cessna 650 Citation III, Citation VI, Citation VII
Cessna 680 Citation Sovereign
Cessna 680A Citation Latitude
Cessna 700 Citation Longitude
Cessna 750 Citation X
Cessna 850 Citation Columbus
Cessna Citation M2
Cessna 1014 XMC
Cessna Citation Hemisphere

Reims-Cessna
The following Cessna models were built by Reims Aviation:
Reims-Cessna F150
Reims-Cessna F152
Reims-Cessna F172
Reims Cessna F177
Reims Cessna F182
Reims Cessna F337
Reims Cessna F406 Caravan II

See also
Beechcraft Denali – a single-engine turboprop business aircraft marketed as a Cessna prior to the prototype stage
Textron AirLand Scorpion – a twin-engine prototype military aircraft constructed by Cessna

References

Notes

Bibliography

Cessna